was a Boeing 727-81 aircraft making a domestic commercial flight from Sapporo Chitose Airport to Tokyo Haneda International Airport. The accident was the worst involving a single aircraft  and was also the deadliest accident in Japan at that time until Japan Air Lines Flight 123 crashed 19 years later, killing 520.

Passengers and crew

The aircraft carried 126 passengers and a crew of seven.

Accident description

Flying in clear weather, ANA Flight 60 was only a few minutes away from Haneda Airport when its pilot radioed he would land visually without instruments. The aircraft then vanished from radar screens.

Villagers along the shore and the pilot of another plane said they saw flames in the sky at about 7 p.m., the moment the plane was due to land. Fishermen and Japanese Defense Force boats picked up bodies from the murky waters of the bay. They had retrieved approximately 20 bodies when an airline spokesman announced the fuselage had been found with scores of bodies inside. He said this led to the belief that all aboard were dead. Grappling hooks from a Coast Guard boat brought up the wreckage.

The tail of the aircraft, including at least two of the three engines, the vertical stabilizer, and the horizontal stabilizer were recovered mostly intact. The rest of the aircraft virtually disintegrated on impact. The death toll of 133 made the crash the world's deadliest single-aircraft accident at the time, as well as the second-deadliest aviation accident behind the 1960 New York mid-air collision. The death toll on a single aircraft would eventually be surpassed when a Lockheed C-130B Hercules was shot down in May 1968, killing 155 people followed by Japan Air Lines Flight 123 which crashed 19 years later outside Tokyo killing 520. The cause for the accident was never determined since this aircraft was never equipped with flight recorders.

Series of crashes

This accident was one of five fatal air disasters—four commercial and one military—in Japan in 1966.  One month after ANA Flight 60's demise, Canadian Pacific Air Lines Flight 402, a Douglas DC-8, struck the approach lights and a seawall at Haneda, killing 64 of 72 on board. Less than 24 hours later, BOAC Flight 911, a Boeing 707, was photographed as it taxied past the still-smoldering wreckage of the Canadian jet, then broke up a couple of hours later whilst in flight above Mt. Fuji – because of clear-air turbulence – shortly after departure, killing all 124 passengers and crew.  A Japan Air Lines Convair 880-22M crashed and killed five people on August 26. Finally, All Nippon Airways Flight 533 crashed and killed 50 people on November 13. The combined effect of these five accidents shook public confidence in commercial aviation in Japan, and both Japan Airlines and All Nippon Airways were forced to cut back some domestic service due to reduced demand.

References

External links


 AirSafe.com Fatal Boeing 727 Events
 

Aviation accidents and incidents in Japan
Aviation accidents and incidents in 1966
Accidents and incidents involving the Boeing 727
Airliner accidents and incidents with an unknown cause
1966 in Japan
All Nippon Airways accidents and incidents
February 1966 events in Asia